Robin Lindqvist (born August 16, 1987) is a retired professional Swedish ice hockey centre. He played for Bodens IK in Allsvenskan, and for Luleå HF, Timrå IK, and Frölunda HC in Elitserien (SEL).

Lindqvist, who missed the entire 2012–13 Elitserien season due to a knee injury, announce his retirement as a player on April 2, 2013.

Career statistics

Regular season and playoffs

International

References

External links

1987 births
Frölunda HC players
Living people
Luleå HF players
Swedish ice hockey centres
Timrå IK players